The 7th Engineer Brigade of the US Army was activated at Fort Belvoir in 1948.
Starting in 1951, while redesignated as the 7th Engineer Aviation Brigade, the brigade was responsible for all US aviation construction in France, Germany, and Italy. Starting in 1956, renamed back to 7th Engineer Brigade, the unit managed construction for NATO. 

The brigade served for many years as the corps engineer formation for VII Corps. In the late 1980s, the brigade reportedly was made up of headquarters at Kornwestheim; Headquarters and Headquarters Company; 9th Engineer Battalion, Aschaffenburg, (M60 AVLB, M728 Combat Engineer Vehicles, M88 Recovery Vehicles, MAB bridge modules); 78th Engineer Battalion, Ettlingen, (M60 AVLB, M728, M88, MAB bridge modules); 82nd Engineer Battalion, Bamberg, (M60 AVLB, M728, M88, 1MAB bridge modules); 237th Engineer Battalion, Heilbronn. All four of these engineer battalions may have had a Table of organization and equipment calling for 8x M60 AVLB, 8x M728, four M88s, and 12 MAB bridge modules. The last of the brigade's battalions was reportedly the 565th Engineer Battalion (Bridge), at Karlsruhe.

7th Engineer Brigade was inactivated in Germany in 1991. Throughout the early 1990s, the 130th Engineer Brigade would continue to see units come and go from its command as they were transferred from the restructuring 18th Engineer Brigade and the deactivating 7th Engineer Brigade.

Stars and Stripes reported that 7th Engineer Brigade was returning to Germany in 2022.

References 

 
 
 

Engineer Brigades of the United States Army
Military units and formations established in the 1940s